Rogowo may refer to the following places:
Rogowo in Kuyavian-Pomeranian Voivodeship (north-central Poland)
Rogowo, Toruń County in Kuyavian-Pomeranian Voivodeship (north-central Poland)
Rogowo, Rypin County in Kuyavian-Pomeranian Voivodeship (north-central Poland)
Rogowo, Augustów County in Podlaskie Voivodeship (north-east Poland)
Rogowo, Białystok County in Podlaskie Voivodeship (north-east Poland)
Rogowo, Maków County in Masovian Voivodeship (east-central Poland)
Rogowo, Gmina Bulkowo in Masovian Voivodeship (east-central Poland)
Rogowo, Gmina Staroźreby in Masovian Voivodeship (east-central Poland)
Rogowo, Greater Poland Voivodeship (west-central Poland)
Rogowo, Pomeranian Voivodeship (north Poland)
Rogowo, Elbląg County in Warmian-Masurian Voivodeship (north Poland)
Rogowo, Gmina Miłomłyn in Warmian-Masurian Voivodeship (north Poland)
Rogowo, Gmina Morąg in Warmian-Masurian Voivodeship (north Poland)
Rogowo, Białogard County in West Pomeranian Voivodeship (north-west Poland)
Rogowo, Gryfice County in West Pomeranian Voivodeship (north-west Poland)
Rogowo, Łobez County in West Pomeranian Voivodeship (north-west Poland)
Rogowo, Stargard County in West Pomeranian Voivodeship (north-west Poland)